In Major League Soccer, several teams annually compete for secondary rivalry cups that are usually contested by only two teams, with the only exceptions being the Cascadia Cup and the new Copa Tejas, which are contested by three MLS teams, each. Each cup or trophy is awarded to the eligible team with the better regular season record and are comparable to minor trophies played for in college football rivalries. Most cups are deliberately conceived as local derbies between teams in the same region. Rivalry cups are considered a tradition to most MLS fans and players alike. Out of the ten original MLS teams only three have not competed in these rivalry cups: Sporting K.C., New England Revolution and the defunct Tampa Bay Mutiny. The Texas Derby is the only MLS rivalry where the winner does not walk away with a cup trophy but instead they play for "El Capitán", a replica 18th century mountain howitzer cannon. Some derbies only contest for bragging rights of rival supporters groups.

Summary

Current 

All records reflect wins made when all participating franchises are MLS teams. 

* Cascadia Cup existed prior to the creation of MLS franchises for Portland, Seattle, and Vancouver.** Copa Tejas was originally conceived for USL clubs, created an MLS division in 2021.

Traditional rivalries
All records reflect wins made (per season) when all participating franchises are MLS teams. No cup/trophy contested. 

*** The Hell Is Real Derby existed prior to FC Cincinnati joining MLS.
 The rivalry between the Portland Timbers and Seattle Sounders has existed in previous teams that are part of their respective legacies, and leagues that have operated prior to MLS.

Former 

* Florida Derby existed prior to creation of MLS franchises for Tampa Bay and Miami, and after teams left MLS in 2001.

Rivalry cups

 Notes

See also 
 Major League Baseball rivalries
 National Basketball Association rivalries
 National Hockey League rivalries
 National Football League rivalries

References

 
Major League Soccer trophies and awards